Drassodes saccatus is a species of ground spiders in the family Gnaphosidae. It is found in North America.

References

Gnaphosidae
Spiders described in 1890